Bulbophyllum shepherdii, commonly known as the wheat-leaf rope orchid, is a species of epiphytic or lithophytic orchid that forms a dense mat of branching rhizomes pressed against the surface on which it grows. The pseudobulbs are well spaced along the rhizome, each with a single egg-shaped leaf and a single small, white or cream-coloured flower with yellow tips. It grows on trees and rocks in rainforest and is endemic to eastern Australia.

Description
Bulbophyllum shepherdii is an epiphytic or lithophytic herb with branching rhizomes forming a dense mat on the substrate. The flowers do not open widely. Flowering occurs from March to August.

Taxonomy and naming
The wheat-leaf rope orchid was first formally described in 1859 by Ferdinand von Mueller who published the description in Fragmenta phytographiae Australiae from a specimen collected by T.W. Shepherd. In 1870 Heinrich Gustav Reichenbach changed the name to Bulbophyllum shepherdii. The specific epithet (shepherdii) honours Thomas William Shepherd who collected the type specimen.

Distribution and habitat
Bulbophyllum shepherdii grows on trees and rocks in rainforest and wet forest between Nambour in Queensland and Bega in New South Wales.

References

shepherdii
Orchids of New South Wales
Orchids of Queensland
Endemic orchids of Australia
Plants described in 1859